Maria Teresa Cabré i Castellví (known as M. Teresa Cabré; born 1947) is a Catalan linguist. She is professor emeritus of Linguistics and Terminology at Pompeu Fabra University (UPF). Since 2021, she has been president of the Institute for Catalan Studies. Her areas of expertise are in lexicology, lexicography, terminology, and discourse analysis.

Biography
Maria Teresa Cabré i Castellví was born in L'Argentera, Baix Camp, Catalonia, Spain, 1947.

She has a degree and doctorate in Romance philology (1976). She was a professor at the University of the Balearic Islands from 1970 to 1971, and at the University of Barcelona from 1971 to 1993. Since 1994, has been teaching Linguistics and Terminology at UPF. She was director of TERMCAT from 1982 to 1988.

She has directed the University Institute of Applied Linguistics at Pompeu Fabra University and is the current director of the Center of Reference in Linguistic Engineering (CREL) of the Catalan Research Plan. She is a founding member of the Iberoamerican Terminology Network (Riterm), of the Iberoamerican Terminology Network (Riterm) (also Chair of its Steering Committee), of the Pan-Latin Terminology Network (Realiter), and of the lexicon group of the European Linguistic Research Association. Since 2019, she has been an International Member of the China Language Policy and Standardization Center. She is also a member of the advisory board of AET, Termnet, Terminology, Sendebar, and MOTS. As head of the Institute of Catalan Studies, she has proposed the creation of a normative pan-Catalan dictionary.

Awards and honours
 2007, Eugen Wüster International Terminology Award (Vienna)
 2008, Knight, Ordre des Arts et des Lettres
 2015, Creu de Sant Jordi
 2018, Doctor honoris causa, University of Geneva
 Doctor honoris causa, (Lima)

Selected works
 Terminología y cognición, 1980 
 Lexicologia i semàntica, 1985 
 Els diccionaris catalans, de 1940 a 1988, 1991
 La terminologie théorie, méthode et applications, 1992 
 Terminology : theory, methods, and applications, 1998
 Terminología y modelos culturales, 1999
 La terminología : representación y comunicación : elementos para una teoría de base comunicativa y otro artículos, 1999
 Textos de terminólogos de la Escuela Rusa, 2001
 La enseñanza de los lenguajes de especialidad : la simulación global, 2006
 Mots nous en català : una panoràmica geolectal = New words in Catalan : a diatopic view, 2014
 La Terminologia avui : termes, textos i aplicacions, 2018

References

Sources

External links
 CV at UPF

1947 births
Living people
People from Baix Camp
Linguists from Catalonia
Pompeu Fabra University
University of the Balearic Islands
University of Barcelona
Institute for Catalan Studies
Chevaliers of the Ordre des Arts et des Lettres
20th-century linguists
21st-century linguists
Women linguists